Tonbak (also known as Ayāhāt, ‘Ayānāt, Ayhāt, Tombak, and Tumbak) is a village in Taheri Rural District, in the Central District of Kangan County, Bushehr Province, Iran. At the 2006 census, its population was 286, in 67 families.

References 

Populated places in Kangan County